is one of syllable in Javanese script that represent the sound /t̪ɔ/, /t̪a/. It is transliterated to Latin as "na", and sometimes in Indonesian orthography as "to".

Pasangan 
Its pasangan form , is located on the bottom side of the previous syllable. For example,  - pedhete (his/her buffalo), which, although transliterated with a single 't', is written using double 'ꦠ' because the rootword ('pedhet', buffalo) ends in 'ꦠ'.

The pasangan has two forms, the other is used when the pasangan is followed by 'ꦸ', 'ꦹ', 'ꦿ', 'ꦽ', or 'ꦾ'. For example,  - anak tuma (little flea)

Murda 
The letter ꦠ has a murda form, which is ꦡ.

Glyphs

Unicode block 

Javanese script was added to the Unicode Standard in October, 2009 with the release of version 5.2.

References 

Javanese script